John Motley Morehead III (November 3, 1870 – January 7, 1965) was an American chemist, politician, and diplomat. As a chemist, his work provided much of the foundation for the business of Union Carbide Corporation.  The Union Carbide and Carbon Corporation was formed in 1917 from the merger of the former Union Carbide founded in 1898 by Morehead's father; and the National Carbon Company founded in 1886. He was a noted philanthropist who made major gifts to his alma mater, the University of North Carolina at Chapel Hill.  He also served as mayor of Rye, New York and United States Ambassador to Sweden.

Morehead came from an illustrious North Carolina family: his father was James Turner Morehead; his grandfather, John Motley Morehead, served as Governor of North Carolina. His sister, Lily Morehead Mebane, was decorated by the governments of France and Serbia for her relief work after World War I; she later served two terms in the North Carolina state legislature.

Morehead graduated from UNC-Chapel Hill in 1891 and was a member of Sigma Alpha Epsilon fraternity.  One of his notable early scientific discoveries was the development of an economical process for the manufacture of calcium carbide.  He was also an authority on the analysis of gases, having invented a device for the purpose and written a book on the subject.

Morehead married Genevieve Margaret Birkhoff.  A few years after her death, he married Leila Duckworth Houghton.  He had no children.  He devoted his considerable fortune to philanthropy, especially to the benefit of UNC-Chapel Hill.  With a college classmate and fraternity brother, Rufus Lenoir Patterson, he donated the Morehead-Patterson Bell Tower on the campus.  He also gave the University the Morehead Planetarium, later renamed the Morehead Planetarium and Science Center.

One of Morehead's particular interests was in providing financial assistance to students attending UNC Chapel Hill.  To that end he endowed the John Motley Morehead Foundation, which each year awards undergraduate scholarships covering the full cost of attendance at UNC Chapel Hill to applicants chosen through an extensive and competitive screening process.  The Morehead-Cain Scholarship is the oldest merit-based scholarship in the United States.

During the First World War, Morehead served as a major in the United States Army; he later became a colonel in the United States Army Reserve. From 1925 to 1930, Morehead served as the Mayor of Rye, New York, and also gave money for the establishment of a new city hall; his nomination as minister to Sweden, from which he served from 1930 to 1933, came during his mayoralty.

He was awarded the North Carolina Award, the highest civilian award bestowed by the U.S. state of North Carolina in the category of Public Service in 1964.

Direct descendants through the paternal line of James Turner Morehead include W. Harris Nelson and William H.M. Nelson III. Non-lineal descendants include Jean Motley Morehead Larkin and John L. Morehead.

There is a section of Interstate 40 named after him, called the John Motley Morehead III Freeway, that passes through Chapel Hill, North Carolina and most of the eastern end of Orange County.

References

External links 
 John Motley Morehead : 200th birthday celebration, 1796-1996 / Robert Lindsay Morehead, Anne Fulcher Nelson, Charles E. Lovelace, Jr.
 The Morehead Foundation
 North Carolina Business Hall of Fame Laureate John Motley Morehead III
 Morehead Planetarium and Science Center
 American Chemical Society National Historic Chemical Landmark, Spray Cotton Mills, Eden, NC

Ambassadors of the United States to Sweden
University of North Carolina at Chapel Hill alumni
1870 births
1965 deaths
Morehead family
People from Rye, New York
American chemists
Mayors of places in New York (state)